The 1st Asian Junior Table Tennis Championships 1983 were held in Al-Manama, Bahrain, from  14 to 23 December 1983. It was organised by the Bahrain Table Tennis Association under the authority of the Asian Table Tennis Union (ATTU) and International Table Tennis Federation (ITTF).

Medal summary

Events

Medal table

See also

Asian Table Tennis Championships
Asian Table Tennis Union

References

Asian Junior and Cadet Table Tennis Championships
Asian Junior and Cadet Table Tennis Championships
Asian Junior and Cadet Table Tennis Championships
Asian Junior and Cadet Table Tennis Championships
Table tennis in Bahrain
International sports competitions hosted by Bahrain
Asian Junior and Cadet Table Tennis Championships